Sixjax is an ecommerce company based in New York City, US.  It is a pay-per-bid online shopping website, with gaming features offering discounts on products as prizes.

Overview 
Sixjax LLC, the company that operates the service and associated website, was established in New York in 2010.  The beta site launched on March 15, 2011 with the interface coded in the Ruby on Rails framework.

Model 
To partake in auctions, users are required to buy a package of tokens.  The offer on each package ranges from 40 to 1000 tokens, depending on whether the package is bought as a one-time purchase or via subscription.  Based on these two modes of buying, tokens are priced from US$0.40 to $0.5. Every token provides one bid that a user can place in an auction.  Therefore, each token counts as one unit per engagement with the site.

Every auction is linked to a price and timer.  Each placed token (bid) raises the value of the auctioned item by $0.01 (all auctions start at $0.00).  If a user submits a token within the last 20 seconds of the auction when there is an existing bid, an additional 20 seconds will be added to the clock.  The auction closes when the timer reads "ENDED," and there is no counterbidder. A hypothetical example of total cost to the bidder: a $99 Apple TV sold on Sixjax for $0.14, won with a bid of one token, the winner paid $0.54 (1 token spent @ $0.40 + $0.14 final auction price) plus shipping.
  
Revenue is derived from the sale of token packages, modified by many token giveaways and promotions.

Auctions and features 

Sixjax currently has the functionality for 6 types of auction, but runs certain types more frequently than others.  The six types are Standard, Specialty, Upper Hand, Last Man Standing, Hyrbid, and VIP.  The Upper Hand and Last Man Standing formats are not used on any other pay-per-bid website.  In May 2011 Sixjax auctioned tickets to the NBA playoffs, including accommodation and airfare, for a total value of $10,500.  The Final Auction price was $0.40.

Sixjax Gaming 

In the summer of 2010, Sixjax sponsored an e-sports team entitled Sixjax Gaming.  The team was composed of six competitive circuit players of PC standout game, StarCraft II. One year after its formation, Sixjax Gaming no longer has active players on its roster.

References 

Electronics companies of the United States
Companies based in New York City